A Leaf in the Storm is a 2003 Chinese television drama series based on Lin Yutang's 1941 novel of the same name, which was first published in English in the United States. The TV series was first shown on CCTV-8 on 12 August 2003. In Taiwan, the series was first shown on Public Television Service on 20 July 2005.

Cast
Wang Yanan as Yao Poya
Meng Yao as Chou Malin
Lee Li-chun as Yao Tienchang
Annie Yi as Chang Wanhsin
Zheng Xiaoning 
Chen Hsiao-hsuan
Han Qing
Lei Kesheng
Wang Shihuai
Gai Ke
Yue Hong

References

2003 Chinese television series debuts
2003 Chinese television series endings
Television shows based on Chinese novels
Television shows filmed in Shanghai
Mandarin-language television shows
China Central Television original programming
Chinese period television series